Johnson Canyon may mean:

A canyon:

In the United States:
 Johnson Canyon (Juab County, Utah)
 and 60 other places in the United States